Malachi Knight-Smith (born December 6, 1999) is an American college basketball player for the Gonzaga Bulldogs of the West Coast Conference.

High school career
Smith started playing high school basketball at Belleville High School-East in Belleville, Illinois before transferring to Belleville High School-West for his senior season. At Belleville West, he averaged 15.5 points alongside E. J. Liddell and helped his team win its first Class 4A state title. Smith committed to playing college basketball for Wright State in November 2017, choosing the Raiders over Lindenwood, Montana State and Denver.

College career
As a freshman at Wright State, Smith averaged 5.4 points and 2.9 rebounds per game, earning Horizon League All-Freshman Team honors. For his sophomore season, he transferred to Chattanooga and sat out for one year due to transfer rules. Smith averaged 16.8 points, 8.8 rebounds and 3.3 assists per game, earning First Team All-Southern Conference (SoCon) honors from the league's coaches, in his first year with the team. He declared for the 2021 NBA draft before returning to college. On November 18, 2021, he scored a career-high 36 points in an 87–76 loss to Murray State.

At the close of his sophomore season, Smith was named the Southern Conference Player of the Year by both the league's coaches and media.

Career statistics

College

|-
| style="text-align:left;"| 2018–19
| style="text-align:left;"| Wright State
| 35 || 0 || 15.1 || .435 || .222 || .820 || 2.9 || 1.7 || .8 || .1 || 5.4
|-
| style="text-align:left;"| 2019–20
| style="text-align:left;"| Chattanooga
| style="text-align:center;" colspan="11"|  Redshirt
|-
| style="text-align:left;"| 2020–21
| style="text-align:left;"| Chattanooga
| 25 || 25 || 35.8 || .460 || .383 || .802 || 8.8 || 3.3 || 1.5 || .2 || 16.8
|-
| style="text-align:left;"| 2021–22
| style="text-align:left;"| Chattanooga
| 35 || 34 || 35.4 || .493 || .407 || .827 || 6.7 || 3.0 || 1.7 || .1 || 19.9
|- class="sortbottom"
| style="text-align:center;" colspan="2"| Career
| 95 || 59 || 28.0 || .473 || .380 || .818 || 5.9 || 2.6 || 1.3 || .1 || 13.7

Personal life
Smith's mother, Connie, served in the United States Air Force for 12.5 years and became an executive assistant for footwear company Caleres. His parents divorced when he was six years old, and he was subsequently raised by his mother. Smith's grandfather, Larry Knight, played professional basketball and was a first-round draft pick by the Utah Jazz.

References

External links
Chattanooga Mocs bio
Wright State Raiders bio

1999 births
Living people
American men's basketball players
Basketball players from Indiana
Basketball players from Illinois
Belleville High School-West alumni
Chattanooga Mocs men's basketball players
Gonzaga Bulldogs men's basketball players
Shooting guards
Sportspeople from Belleville, Illinois
Sportspeople from Evansville, Indiana
Wright State Raiders men's basketball players